The Troubridge Baronetcy, of Plymouth, is a title in the Baronetage of Great Britain. It was created on 30 November 1799 for Captain Thomas Troubridge, a distinguished officer of the Royal Navy, who later became an admiral. The second baronet was also a Royal Navy admiral and sat as Member of Parliament for Sandwich. The third baronet fought with distinction in the Crimean War, in which he was severely wounded.

The family surname is pronounced "Troobridge".

Troubridge baronets, of Plymouth (1799)
Sir Thomas Troubridge, 1st Baronet (1758–1807)
Sir Edward Thomas Troubridge, 2nd Baronet (1787–1852)
Sir Thomas St Vincent Hope Cochrane Troubridge, 3rd Baronet (1815–1862)
Sir Thomas Herbert Cochrane Troubridge, 4th Baronet (13 September 1860 – 5 December 1938). Troubridge married Laura Gurney in 1893, and had one son, the fifth Baronet, and two daughters.
Sir (Thomas) St Vincent Wallace Troubridge, 5th Baronet (15 November 1895 – 16 December 1963). Troubridge married Pamela Clough in 1939, but had no issue.
Sir Peter Troubridge, 6th Baronet (6 June 1927 – 27 September 1988). Troubridge was the eldest son of Admiral Sir Thomas Hope Troubridge (1895–1949), and succeeded his cousin in the baronetcy in 1963. He married the Hon. Venetia Daphne Weeks, daughter of Ronald Weeks, 1st Baron Weeks, in 1954, and had issue one son, the seventh Baronet, and two daughters.
Sir Thomas Troubridge, 7th Baronet (born 1955), educated at Eton College and Durham University (University College), former Partner at PriceWaterhouseCoopers and now serves on the board of St Mark's Hospital. Troubridge has been married since 1984 to the Hon. Rosemary Douglas-Pennant (born 1957), younger daughter of Malcolm Douglas-Pennant, 6th Baron Penrhyn, and has issue. The heir to the baronetcy is his elder son Edward Peter Troubridge (born 10 August 1989)

Other members of the family

Edward Norwich Troubridge, second son of the second baronet, was a captain in the Royal Navy. Laura, Lady Troubridge, wife of the fourth baronet, was a writer for Mills and Boon and author of The Book of Etiquette (1926).  Admiral Sir Ernest Troubridge (1862–1926), was a younger son of the third baronet and grandfather of the sixth.  At the outbreak of the First World War he was second in command of the Mediterranean Fleet, but his career was blighted by the Goeben affair. His estranged wife Una Vincenzo, Lady Troubridge was most famous as the partner of the author Radclyffe Hall. Thomas Troubridge, a banker who was the first husband of Princess Michael of Kent, was a younger brother of the sixth baronet.

Footnotes

References
Kidd, Charles, Williamson, David (editors). Debrett's Peerage and Baronetage (1990 edition). New York: St Martin's Press, 1990, 

Baronetcies in the Baronetage of Great Britain
1799 establishments in Great Britain